SpreadsheetML is the XML schema for Microsoft Office Excel 2003.

The Office 2003 XML Reference Schemas are included in the Microsoft Open Specification Promise, a legal statement concerning unrestricted use of Microsoft intellectual property.

See also
Microsoft Office 2003 XML formats
Office Open XML
OpenDocument

References

External links
 XML Spreadsheet Reference
 ECMA Office Open XML File Formats overview

Computer file formats
Technical communication
Markup languages